The 2017 Dynamic Dutch Open, was the fourth Euro Tour 9-Ball pool event in 2017. The event was won by Russia's Ruslan Chinakhov who defeated Germany's Christoph Reintjes 9–4 in the final.

Tournament format
The event saw a total of 1199 players compete, in a double-elimination knockout tournament, until the last 32 stage; where the tournament was contested as single elimination.

Prize fund

Tournament results

References

External links

Euro Tour
Sports competitions in Heeze-Leende
2017 Euro Tour events